Cymbium senegalense is a species of sea snail, a marine gastropod mollusk in the family Volutidae, the volutes.

Description

Distribution
This marine species occurs off Senegal.

References

  Bail, P.; Poppe, G.T. (2001). A conchological iconography: a taxonomic introduction of the recent Volutidae. ConchBooks, Hackenheim. 30 pp, 5 pl.

External links
 Marche-Marchad I. & Rosso J.C. 1978. Les Cymbium du Sénégal. Notes Africaines, 178: 1-19

Volutidae
Molluscs of the Atlantic Ocean
Invertebrates of West Africa
Gastropods described in 1978